Tang or TANG most often refers to:
 Tang dynasty
 Tang (drink mix)

Tang or TANG may also refer to:

Chinese states and dynasties
 Jin (Chinese state) (11th century – 376 BC), a state during the Spring and Autumn period, called Tang (唐) before 8th century BC
 Tang dynasty (唐; 618–907), a major Chinese dynasty
 Later Tang (唐; 923–937), a state during the Five Dynasties and Ten Kingdoms period
 Southern Tang (唐; 937–975), a state during the Five Dynasties and Ten Kingdoms period

Food
 Tang (drink mix), a brand name of instant fruit flavored drinks, produced by Mondelēz International
 Guk, soup or stew in Korean cuisine, sometimes known as "tang"

Places

Europe
 Tang, County Westmeath, a village in Ireland
 Tang, North Yorkshire, a settlement in England

Asia
 Tang, Ardabil, a village in Ardabil Province, Iran
 Tang, Badakhshan, a village in Afghanistan
 Tang, a village in Bumthang District, Bhutan
 Tang (唐镇), a town in Pudong, Shanghai, China
 Tang, Sistan and Baluchesstan, a village in Sistan and Baluchesstan Province, Iran
 Tang County (唐县), Baoding, Hebei, China
 Tang Gonda, a village in Khuzestan Province, Iran
 Tang Julan, a village in Khuzestan Province, Iran
 Tang-e Rashid, a village in Khuzestan Province, Iran
 Tang-e Zirgol Bardar, a village in Khuzestan Province, Iran

People

Surnames
 Táng (surname) (唐), romanized as Tang
 Tāng (surname) (湯/汤), romanized as Tang 
 Deng (surname) (鄧/邓), sometimes romanized as Tang 
 Teng (surname) (滕), rarely romanized as Tang

Other people
 Tang of Shang (湯;  – 1646 BC), first king of the Shang Dynasty
 Tang Chinese, used in southern China to refer to the Han Chinese
 Tang Clan (鄧族) of Hong Kong, among the first inhabitants to settle in Hong Kong

Ships
 US submarines named after the fish, including
  of the United States Navy
 , the lead ship of that class
 , a United States Navy Balao-class submarine that served briefly in World War II before being sunk by one of its own torpedoes
 Type 096 submarine Tang class of the People's Liberation Army Navy of the People's Republic of China

Other uses
 Tang (clevis), part of a clevis fastener or joint
 Tang (fish), Acanthuridae, a family of marine fish
 Tang (tools), a projecting element connecting the blade or operational part of a knife or other tool to the handle
 Tang sight, a rear sight attached to a rifle tang
 Tape measure, tang, the hook at the end of a tape measure
 BYD Tang, a car
 Tang, a fish in the American television series FishCenter Live
 Tang, in beekeeping, to make sharp, metallic, ringing sounds so as to attract bees to a land in a trap or hive.

Acronyms
 Tennessee Air National Guard
 Texas Air National Guard
 Texas Army National Guard

See also
 Tange (disambiguation)
 Tong (organization)